Brooke Green is an American politician and businesswoman serving as a member of the Idaho House of Representatives from the 18th district, which includes a portion of Boise, Idaho.

Early life and education 
Green was raised in Los Alamos, New Mexico. She has an identical twin sister, Dawn. She earned a Bachelor of Arts degree in communications and marketing technology from Boise State University, followed by a Master of Business Administration from Northwest Nazarene University.

Career 
Green works as a transportation planner at the Ada County Highway District. She also served as chair of the City of Boise Open Space and Clean Water. Green was elected to the Idaho House of Representatives in 2018.

Personal life 
Green's husband, Jeremy Byington, is a sheriff with the Ada County Sheriff's Department and veteran of the Iraq War. They live in Boise, Idaho.

References 

Living people
People from Los Alamos, New Mexico
Democratic Party members of the Idaho House of Representatives
Boise State University alumni
Northwest Nazarene University alumni
People from Boise, Idaho
Year of birth missing (living people)
21st-century American politicians
21st-century American women politicians
Women state legislators in Idaho
Identical twins
American twins